Mazus miquelii, commonly known as Miquel's mazus or creeping mazus, is a species of herbaceous perennial groundcover native to Japan and China.

Description
Mazus miquelii spreads rapidly by producing significant amounts of slender stolons which root at the nodes. The leaves are undivided and teethed along the margins. The blue or purple flowers are bilateral and have 5 petals, which emerge during the months of June to August. This species is hermaphroditic and is pollinated by insects.

Habitat
Mazus miquelii has been introduced in North America, and as such is considered an invasive weed, especially in parts of the north-east United States. This species thrives in damp, bog-like conditions, and cannot tolerate dry periods.

References

miquelii
Garden plants of Asia
Groundcovers